N-Acetyltalosaminuronic acid is a uronic acid. It is a component of pseudopeptidoglycan, a structural polymer found in the cell walls in some types of Archaea.

Amino sugars
Sugar acids